Empress Zhang (張皇后, personal name unknown) (died  349) was briefly an empress of the Chinese/Jie state Later Zhao. She was Shi Zun's wife and the last empress in Later Zhao history.  

After Shi Zun, a son of the emperor Shi Hu, took over the throne in 349 after overthrowing his younger brother Shi Shi, he made her empress.  He reigned for only 183 days before he was overthrown in a coup by his brother Shi Jian and his adoptive nephew Shi Min.  Soon thereafter, both Empress Zhang and her husband were executed by Shi Min.

References 

349 deaths
Later Zhao empresses
4th-century Chinese women
4th-century Chinese people
Executed royalty
Year of birth unknown